Susan Montgomery Williams (c. 1961 – 2008) was an American record-holding bubblegum-blower. She set a Guinness World Record for the largest bubble blown,  in diameter, in 1994.

Early life
Susan Montgomery was born in National City, California, and grew up in the San Joaquin Valley. As a student at Roosevelt High School in Fresno, she discovered and developed her bubble-blowing talent. She did not graduate from high school and later qualified for disability insurance due to epilepsy.

Bubblegum-blowing
In 1994, Williams set a Guinness World Record for bubblegum-blowing with a  bubble.

Williams claimed that she could pop her gum louder than any competitors. In October 1989 she was arrested at the Fresno Fair after her loud popping disturbed attendees at an outdoor Smokey Robinson concert and she refused to desist. Those charges were dropped in February 1990, but while in the courthouse to answer those charges, Williams' popping in the hallway disturbed jury selection in a murder case. Bailiffs at first believed the noise came from a .38 caliber pistol shot. Though protesting that no law forbids gum chewing in hallways, Williams was arrested, fined $150, and sentenced to serve 30 days in jail. The sentence was suspended "on the condition that she never snap or pop gum in the courthouse again".

Williams made television appearances in Spain, Germany, England, Japan, and the United States, including on The Johnny Carson Show and The Jay Leno Show. In July 1990, a Smithsonian magazine article on bubblegum featured a photo of Williams blowing a  bubble. Williams maintained a Myspace page, "ChewsySuzy", which explained: "She learned that she could touch a bubble without popping it. Then she found she could begin a bubble by holding it with her fingers and holding it away from her nose and chin."

Personal life
She married Joseph C. Williams Jr., with whom she had two children. They later divorced.

In September 2008 Williams suffered a stroke. She died of an aneurysm at the age of 47 on October 1, 2008, in Fresno.

References

External links

"Guinness World Record Bubble Gum Blow" (video)

2008 deaths
People from Fresno, California
Candy
World record holders
Deaths from aneurysm